In the year 2000, UMM launched a new version of the Alter, the Alter 2000. With a 2.1 litre Turbo Diesel engine made by Peugeot, this engine was claimed to be quieter, more fuel efficient and had more torque. The suspension, the brakes system and interior (mainly dashboard) were redesigned. It was available in several trims and chassis configurations. Only 25 cars were made, the majority still in Portugal.

The Engine

The Alter 2000 was only available with a 2.1 Litre, Indirect Injection, 12v, Turbo Diesel engine which delivered 110 PS. This engine also featured in the Peugeot 406, Peugeot 605 and in the Citröen XM.

Equipment

As optional equipment, the Alter 2000 had available air conditioning, leather seats, GPS Navigation, etc.

External links
 UMM's Official Website
 UMM's Unofficial French Site
 Portuguese UMM forum

Off-road vehicles
Cars of Portugal
Cars introduced in 2000
Cars discontinued in 2004
All-wheel-drive vehicles